Oakland is an unincorporated community in Van Zandt County, Texas, United States. According to the Handbook of Texas, the community had a population of 26 in 2000. It is located within the Dallas/Fort Worth Metroplex.

History
Oakland had two churches, one business, and 20 residents in 1939. That business, a cemetery, and several scattered houses were in the community in 1965. The population was recorded as 26 from 1974 through 2000.

Geography

Education
Oakland had its own school in 1890. It had 21 students enrolled in 1906. Today, the community is served by the Grand Saline Independent School District.

References

Unincorporated communities in Van Zandt County, Texas
Unincorporated communities in Texas